The Delivery Man is a British sitcom shown on ITV for one series in 2015. The series stars Darren Boyd as Matthew Bunting, a former police constable starting a new career as a midwife. From August 2015 the series starting showing on Netflix in the UK, Ireland, United States, Canada, Australia and New Zealand.

Production
A pilot episode was shot in February 2014. The first series was filmed between October and December 2014 at 3 Mills Studios.

Cast and characters
Darren Boyd as Matthew Bunting
Aisling Bea as Lisa McGeoghan, junior midwife
Joe da Costa as Ryan Sexington, Lisa's boyfriend
Fay Ripley as Caitlin Tilby, senior midwife
Paddy McGuinness as Ian Hanwell, police officer
Alex MacQueen as Luke Edward, senior consultant obstetrician
Llewella Gideon as Patricia Pattinson, senior midwife
Jennie Jacques as Natasha Phipps (AKA "Tash"), junior midwife

Episodes

Reception
The Independent was moderately positive on the series, though found it lacking compared to Green Wing. The Telegraph dubbed the series punchy.

References

External links

2015 British television series debuts
2015 British television series endings
2010s British sitcoms
ITV sitcoms
2010s British medical television series
English-language television shows